Streptomyces coeruleorubidus is a bacterium species from the genus of Streptomyces which has been isolated from marine sediment.  Streptomyces coeruleorubidus produces the following medications: pacidamycin 1, baumycin B1, baumycin B2, baumycin C1, feudomycin A, feudomycin B, feudomycin C, ficellomycin, feudomycinone A, and rubomycin.

Further reading

See also 
 List of Streptomyces species

References

External links
Type strain of Streptomyces coeruleorubidus at BacDive -  the Bacterial Diversity Metadatabase

coeruleorubidus
Bacteria described in 1958